David Spriggs may refer to:
 David Spriggs (footballer)
 David Spriggs (artist)